Pavuluri Mallana was an Indian mathematician of the 11th or early 12th century CE from present day Andhra Pradesh. Some historians consider him to be a contemporary of the Eastern Chalukya king Rajaraja Narendra (1022–1063 CE), while others place him in early 12th century CE. He translated Gaṇitasārasangraha, a 9th century mathematical treatise of Mahaviracharya, into Telugu as Sāra Sangraha Ganitamu, popularly known as Pavuluri Ganitamu. It was one of the earliest translations of a mathematical text from Sanskrit into a regional language. It is the oldest scientific text written in the Telugu language. It was followed later by Eluganti Peddana's Prakīrna Ganitamu, a Telugu translation of Bhāskara's Līlāvatī.

George Gheverghese Joseph notes that Mallana's translation served as a model for future translations because of its clarity and innovation. Sreeramula Rajeswara Sarma writes of him as:Mallana was a superb translator. The lucidity with which he rendered the terse Sanskrit of Mahāvīra is worth emulating by every modern translator of scientific texts. His way of handling mathematical rules or examples containing large numbers - some examples have as many as 36 digits - is unrivaled even in Sanskrit. He abridged the material of the Sanskrit original at certain places and expanded at others. Thus while Gaṇitasārasan̄graha contains five methods of squaring and seven of cubing, the Telugu version has only one each and avoids all algebraic methods. Mallana also employs units of measure that were prevalent in the Andhra region of his time. Another innovation or addition in Telugu version pertains to mathematics proper. There are 45 additional examples under multiplication and 21 under division, which are not found in Sanskrit. All these examples have one common feature: to produce numbers containing a symmetric arrangement of digits. He was a Saivite. His grandson, also named Mallana, was a famous writer. However, some historians consider Pavuluri Mallana, the mathematician to be the grandson of Mallana, the poet. Rajaraja Narendra donated Nava Khandavada village near Pithapuram to Mallana, but it is not clear to which Mallana the grant refers to.

Sāra Sangraha Ganitamu 
While Mahavira's work was said to be in eight adhikaras or topics, Mallana adapted it into ten topics in his Sāra Sangraha Ganitamu. The first topic has been popular as Pavuluri Ganitamu. The other chapters are (in chronological order): Bhagahara Ganitamu, Suvarga Ganitamu, Misra Ganitamu, Bhinna Ganitamu, Kshetra Ganitamu, Khāta Ganitamu, Chāya Ganitamu, Sutra Ganitamu, and Prakirna Ganitamu.

See also
List of Indian mathematicians

References

Telugu people
Year of death unknown
Year of birth unknown
Scientists from Andhra Pradesh
11th-century Indian mathematicians
11th-century Indian scholars
Scholars from Andhra Pradesh

People from East Godavari district